Asok station is a BTS Skytrain station, on the Sukhumvit Line in Watthana and Khlong Toei Districts, Bangkok, Thailand. The station is located on Sukhumvit Road at Asok Montri Road (Sukhumvit Soi 21), with interchange to MRT Blue Line at Sukhumvit station. This was its southeastern terminus before it was extended.

Around the station are many hotels and facilities for foreign tourists and business people. The area to the west is a continuation of the Nana entertainment zone, and to east is dense commercial area with numerous skyscrapers. Srinakharinwirot University (Prasarnmit Campus). The Siam Society, knowledge society with facilities for learning art, history, culture and natural sciences of Thailand and neighbouring countries, is to the north of the station on Asok Montri Road, and is also near Korea Town.

History 
Elevated in Honor of His Majesty the King's 6th Cycle Birthday, Route 1 has been assigned to the Sukhumvit Line, which runs 17 kilometers from Mo Chit Station to On Nut Station. On August 12th, 2011, a Sukhumvit Line extension from On Nut Station to Bearing Station went into operation. Five stops are located throughout the expansion's 5.25 km length. 
The Bearing-Samrong segment of the Sukhumvit Line Extension (MRT Green Line Project) went into operation on April 3, 2017. The new station expansion at Samrong covers a distance of 1.8 kilometers. On December 6th, 2018, the MRT Green Line Project's Bearing to Samut Prakan section of the Sukhumvit Line Extension went into operation. Pu Chao Station, Chang Erawan Station, Royal Thai Naval Academy Station, Pak Nam Station, Srinagarindra Station, Phraek Sa Station, Sai Luat Station, and Kheha Station are among the stations that are served by the eight-station expansion. It is an additional 11 kilometers. The BTS SkyTrain traverses 18.05 kilometers and stops at 14 stations between On Nut Station and Kheha Station. As for the 6th Cycle Birthday Anniversary, BTS Station is a railway route on the Sukhumvit Line of the MRT Project (Asok Station, code E4). BTS Nana and BTS Phrom Phong are nearby stations that connect to BTS Mo Chit and BTS Bearing, respectively. Both stations are elevated over Sukhumvit Road. From Area 4 at the Asok Montri Intersection, you can get to MRT Sukhumvit Station. This is the preferred situation.
With the location's rapid and simple access to several kinds of transportation, it is also surrounded by facilities like schools, retail stores, restaurants, or numerous tourist spots. Condominiums near the BTS Despite being constructed in huge numbers, Asok condos are highly sought after by residents. Since this area is home to several office buildings. You might also call it the Asok CBD Office Building.

Nearby attraction

Department stores
Terminal 21 : Major department stores in this city that contain well-known brand products as well as several good restaurants especially the famous food court. Even in the city's center, the price is reasonable. Nearby BTS Asok and MRT Sukhumvit.

Time squre : Office building in Asok area, good location, reason because Time Square building is next to BTS Asok (BTS Asok), within walking distance from BTS Asok. Connect to the building on the 3rd floor and connect to the elevator to go up to the office.

Sukhumvit plaza (Korea town) : Community Mall and is the center of South Korean people working in Thailand. Exchange student tourist and Thai customers who are fascinated by K-Pop culture come to travel, shop and make an appointment to eat South Korean food with atmosphere and taste delivered directly from the country of Kimchi. Until being called Korean Town in the heart of Asok.

Tourist Places
Benjakiti Park : One of Bangkok's large public parks. There are both recreation areas jogging track and bike lane. Only 1 station away from BTS Asok and MRT Sukhumvit.

Soy Cowboy : Soi Cowboy is near Sukhumvit Road, between Asok Montri Road (Soi Sukhumvit 21) and Soi Sukhumvit 23, within walking distance from the BTS Skytrain's Asok Station and the Bangkok MRT's Sukhumvit Station. The Pullman Bangkok Grande Sukhumvit Hotel is nearby.

Hotels
CLOUD​ Residences​ SKV-23

The ESSE Asok

Grande Centre Point Hotel Terminal 21

Sheraton Grande Sukhumvit

Offices
GMM Grammy

Connecting station
Asok BTS is connected to Nana Station and Phrom Phong Station.
Nana station is a sky train station located on the BTS SkyTrain Sukhumvit Line elevated over Sukhumvit Road in Bangkok in honor of His Majesty the King's 6th cycle electric train route. At the center of the tourist industry and entertainment area in Nana.
Phrom Phong is a major retail centers including EmQuartier and an emporium with frequent sales are adjacent to the station. If you're looking to work out or get some fresh air, there's also a Benjasiri Park close by.

MRT Interchange
Asok BTS Skytrain Station (BTS Asok Station) is a large station which is a connecting station between MRT Sukhumvit Station (You can change from the BTS to MRT at intersection stations – simply exit one station and walk into the other station. Intersection stations are: Asoke BTS / Sukhumvit MRT). At the Asok Montri intersection which is an intersection in Bangkok
Located in Khlong Toei Subdistrict, Khlong Toei District and Khlong Toei Nuea Subdistrict, Wattana District, Bangkok It is an intersection that is the intersection between Sukhumvit Road. Ratchadapisek Road and Asok Montri Road.

Operation schedule
Monday – Friday : 06:00 – 12:00 am

Normal hour: average headway not exceeding 5 minutes per train.

Saturday to Sunday and Public Holiday : 06:00 – 12:00 am

Normal hour: average headway not exceeding 7 minutes per train.

Last train departing from Siam to all stations at 00:02 hrs.

Last train departing from Siam to Samrong/Ha Yaek Lat Phrao/Bang Wa/National Stadium at 00:15 hrs.

Fare rate
Fares BTS Sukhumvit Line or Green Line
Single Journey Card
Can be used for 1 trip between stations  according to the specified fare rates (The current fare is 16-44 baht).
Valid for traveling only on the date of purchase.
The ticket will be collected at the automatic gate on the departure side.
Available at ticket vending machines.

Gate 
Exit 1 Sukhumvit  soi 19, Bus stop ( to Phromphong ), M floor of Terminal 21 shopping mall.
Exit 2 Bus stop ( To Nana ),  Sukhumvit soi 12.
Exit 3 MRT Sukhumvit station, Asok montri Road , The Siam Society Under Royal Patronage, Srinakharinwirot University, M floor of Terminal 21 shopping mall.
Exit 4 Sukhumvit  soi 14, Sukhumvit  soi 16, Ratchadaphisek Road, Benjakitti Park.

Gallery

BTS Skytrain stations

References
 https://www.bts.co.th/eng/info/info-history.html
 https://www.dotproperty.co.th/blog/bts-อโศก-ย่านใจกลางธุรกิจ-cbd-เชื่อมต่อทุกจังหวะของการใช้ชีวิต
 https://travelhappy.info/bangkok-bts-and-mrt-map
 https://en.wikipedia.org/wiki/Soi_Cowboy
 https://article.redprice.co/bts-prompong-map
 https://www.dotproperty.co.th/blog/bts
 https://www.officehello.com/review-time-square/
 https://th.m.wikipedia.org/wiki/
 https://metro.bemplc.co.th/MRT-System-Map?lang=en